Peter Waterman (8 December 1934 – 16 January 1986) was an English boxer and a British and European welterweight champion.

Waterman was born in Stepney, East London, England, one of nine children of Rose Juliana (née Saunders) and Harry Frank Waterman. His younger brother, Dennis Waterman, became an actor and singer. His father had been an amateur boxer and made all of his sons box.

He began boxing at the age of 11 and had an amateur career winning 121 of his 130 bouts. He won the 1952 Amateur Boxing Association British light-welterweight title, when boxing out of the Caius ABC.

In 1952, he represented the Great Britain at the 1952 Summer Olympics at Helsinki, Finland, in the light-welterweight class.

When Waterman was 18, he became a professional and won the British welterweight title in 1956. In 1957, he beat Emilio Marconi to gain the European welterweight title. In April 1958, after a fight with British lightweight champion, Dave Charnley, he had to be helped to the dressing room. A few months later Waterman underwent brain surgery and never fought again.

He died suddenly in Islington at the age of 51.

References

|-

1934 births
1986 deaths
Boxers at the 1952 Summer Olympics
Boxers from Greater London
English male boxers
Olympic boxers of Great Britain
People from Stepney
Welterweight boxers